Humicola is a genus of fungi belonging to the family Chaetomiaceae.

The genus has cosmopolitan distribution.

Species

Species:
 Humicola alopallonella 
 Humicola ampulliella 
 Humicola asteroidea

References

Fungi